Joana the equivalent of Joanna in Catalan and Portuguese. The Galician form of the name is Xoana. It may refer to:
 Joana Benedek – a Mexican actress
 Joana of Braganza, a.k.a. Joana of Portugal (1635-1653) – a Portuguese princess, daughter of John IV
 Joana Ceddia – a Brazilian-Canadian YouTuber
 Joana Glaza – the Lithuanian lead singer of rock group Joana and the Wolf
 Joana Prado – a Brazilian actress
 Joana Rokomatu – a Fijian chief
 Joana Zimmer – a German pop music singer

See also
 Joanna